Incomplete may refer to:
 Unfinished creative work
 Gödel's incompleteness theorems, a specification of logic
 "Incomplete" (Bad Religion song), 1994
 "Incomplete" (Sisqó song), 1999
 "Incomplete" (Backstreet Boys song), 2005
 "Incomplete" (Hoobastank song), 2013
 Incomplete (Nembrionic album), or the title track
 Incomplete (Diaura album), 2015
 Incomplete pass, a gridiron football term
 Incomplete abortion (or incomplete miscarriage), a medical term
 "Incomplete", a song by Alanis Morissette on the 2008 album Flavors of Entanglement
 “Incomplete”, an episode of The Good Doctor